Nant Conwy Rugby Football Club is a rugby union team from the upper reaches of the Conwy Valley in North Wales. The club's grounds are located on the B5106 between the town of Llanrwst and the village of Trefriw.

They presently play in the Welsh Rugby Union Division One North League. Although Nant Conwy have a short history, having been established only in 1980, they have managed to achieve success on the pitch, earning several division promotions in recent years.

In 2007 the club successfully applied for funding to install floodlights at their ground.

In 2011 the club opened a new, extended clubhouse.

Club badge
The club badge consists of the head of a black bull over the club's name, Clwb Rygbi Nant Conwy.

Club honours
2001/02 WRU Division Six North - Champions
2008/09 WRU Division Four North - Champions
2009/10 WRU Division One North - Champions
2011/12 Swalec Plate - Runners Up
2012/13 WRU Division One North - Champions
2012/13 North Wales Cup - Champions
2014/15 North Wales Cup  - Champions
2015/16 North Wales Cup - Champions

References

Welsh rugby union teams
Rugby clubs established in 1980
Sport in Conwy County Borough
Trefriw